Claude Cecil Johnson (January 4, 1894 – January 5, 1965), nicknamed "Hooks", was an American Negro league second baseman between 1916 and 1930.

A native of Youngstown, Ohio, Johnson made his Negro leagues debut in 1916 for the Lincoln Stars. He went on to play for several teams, including three seasons with the Cleveland Tate Stars, and three with the Detroit Stars, before finishing his career with the Birmingham Black Barons in 1930. Johnson died in Youngstown in 1965 at age 71.

References

External links
 and Baseball-Reference Black Baseball stats and Seamheads

1894 births
1965 deaths
Baltimore Black Sox players
Birmingham Black Barons players
Cleveland Tate Stars players
Detroit Stars players
Harrisburg Giants players
Homestead Grays players
Lincoln Stars (baseball) players
Baseball second basemen
Baseball players from Youngstown, Ohio
20th-century African-American sportspeople